The fourth election to Rhondda Cynon Taf County Borough Council was held in May 2008.  It was preceded by the 2004 election and followed by the 2012 election.  On the same day there were elections to  the other 21 local authorities in Wales as well as community councils.

Boundary Changes
There were no boundary changes at this election.

Overview
All 75 council seats were up for election. Labour maintained control of the authority.

|}

Ward Results

Aberaman North (two seats)

Aberaman South (two seats)

Abercynon (two seats)

Aberdare East (two seats)

Aberdare West, Llwydcoed (three seats)

Beddau (one seat)

Brynna (one seat)

Church Village (one seat)

Cilfynydd (one seat)

Cwmbach (one seat)

Cwm Clydach (one seat)

Cymmer (two seats)

Ferndale (two seats)

Gilfach Goch (one seat)

Glyncoch (one seat)

Graig (one seat)

Hawthorn (one seat)

Hirwaun (one seat)

Llanharan (one seat)

Llanharry (one seat)

Llantrisant (one seat)

Llantwit Fardre (two seats)
One of the councillors elected for Plaid in 2004 had defected to Labour.

Llwynypia (one seat)

Maerdy (one seat)

Mountain Ash East (one seat)

Mountain Ash West (two seats)

Penrhiwceiber (two seats)

Pentre (two seats)

Penygraig (two seats)

Penywaun (one seat)

Pontyclun (two seats)

Pontypridd (one seat)

Porth (two seats)

Rhigos (one seat)
The sitting Plaid Cymru member had been returned unopposed in 1999.

Rhondda (two seats)

Rhydfelen Central / Ilan (one seat)

Taffs Well (one seat)

Talbot Green (one seat)

Tonteg (two seats)

Tonypandy (one seat)
The retiring member had defected from Plaid Cymru to the Liberal Democrats since 1999.

Tonyrefail East (two seats)

Tonyrefail West (one seat)

Trallwn (one seat)

Trealaw (one seat)

Treforest (one seat)

Treherbert (two seats)

Treorchy (three seats)

Tylorstown (two seats)

Tyn-y-Nant (one seat)

Ynyshir (one seat)

Ynysybwl (one seat)

Ystrad (two seats)

References

Rhondda
Rhondda Cynon Taf County Borough Council elections